Georgy Stepanovich Shonin (3 August 1935 – 7 April 1997; born in Rovenky, Luhansk Oblast, (now Ukraine) but grew up in Balta of Ukrainian SSR) was a Soviet cosmonaut, who flew on the Soyuz 6 space mission.

Shonin's family hid a Jewish family from the Nazis during WWII.

In February 1957, Shonin graduated Naval Aviation School as was awarded his lieutenant's wings. He was then posted to the 935th Fighter Regiment of the Baltic Fleet which was the naval element of the Soviet Air Force. In 1958, he was transferred to the 768th Fighter Regiment of the Northern Fleet based in the Murmansk region. During this time, he would befriend another young flying officer named Yuri Gagarin.

Shonin was part of the original group of cosmonauts selected in 1960. Shonin would fly on Soyuz 6 in October 1969. He left the space program in 1979 for medical reasons. HE was then promoted to major general. Shonin later worked as the director of the 30th Central Scientific Research Institute, Ministry of Defence (Russia) where he had management responsibilities for the development of the Buran space shuttle.

He died of a heart attack in 1997.

Awards and honors 

 Hero of the Soviet Union
 Pilot-Cosmonaut of the USSR
 Order of Lenin
 Order of the October Revolution
 Order of the Red Banner of Labour
 Order of the Red Star
 Ten commemorative medals
 Medal "25 Years of People's Power" (Bulgaria)
 Three medals from the Mongolian People's Republic
 Five medals from the Czechoslovak Socialist Republic

References

1935 births
1997 deaths
People from Rovenky
Soviet cosmonauts
1969 in spaceflight
Heroes of the Soviet Union
Recipients of the Order of Lenin
Military Academy of the General Staff of the Armed Forces of the Soviet Union alumni
Soviet Air Force generals
Soviet lieutenant generals